Order of the White Falcon is a grand-ducal order of Grand Duchy of Saxe-Weimar-Eisenach, founded by Duke Ernest Augustus on 2 August 1732, and renewed in 1815 by Charles Augustus.

Description
In the early 20th century it had four classes and a silver cross, added in 1878. The decoration, a green star of eight points, with red stars between the arms, bears a white falcon, and the motto, Vigilando Ascendimus (Through vigilance we ascend), on a blue ground.

 Abdul Hamid II
 Prince Adalbert of Prussia (1811–1873)
 Prince Adalbert of Prussia (1884–1948)
 Duke Adolf Friedrich of Mecklenburg
 Adolphe, Grand Duke of Luxembourg
 Prince Albert of Prussia (1809–1872)
 Prince Albert of Saxe-Altenburg
 Albert of Saxony
 Prince Albert of Saxony (1875–1900)
 Archduke Albrecht, Duke of Teschen
 Prince Albert Victor, Duke of Clarence and Avondale
 Albert, Prince Consort
 Prince Albert of Prussia (1837–1906)
 Albert, Prince of Schwarzburg-Rudolstadt
 Alexander I of Russia
 Alexander II of Russia
 Alexander III of Russia
 Alexander Frederick, Landgrave of Hesse
 Prince Alexander of Hesse and by Rhine
 Alexander, Prince of Orange
 Grand Duke Alexei Alexandrovich of Russia
 Alexis, Landgrave of Hesse-Philippsthal-Barchfeld
 Alfred, Duke of Saxe-Coburg and Gotha
 Alfred, Hereditary Prince of Saxe-Coburg and Gotha
 Alfred, 2nd Prince of Montenuovo
 Prince Arnulf of Bavaria
 Maximilian de Beauharnais, 3rd Duke of Leuchtenberg
 Prince Oscar Bernadotte
 Bernhard II, Duke of Saxe-Meiningen
 Bernhard III, Duke of Saxe-Meiningen
 Prince Bernhard of Saxe-Weimar-Eisenach (1792–1862)
 Theobald von Bethmann Hollweg
 Otto von Bismarck
 Hans von Boineburg-Lengsfeld
 Bernhard von Bülow
 Prince Carl, Duke of Västergötland
 Carlos I of Portugal
 Carol I of Romania
 Princess Caroline Reuss of Greiz
 Charles I of Württemberg
 Charles Alexander, Grand Duke of Saxe-Weimar-Eisenach
 Charles Augustus, Hereditary Grand Duke of Saxe-Weimar-Eisenach (1844–1894)
 Charles Frederick, Grand Duke of Saxe-Weimar-Eisenach
 Charles Michael, Duke of Mecklenburg
 Prince Charles of Prussia
 Prince Robert, Duke of Chartres
 Chlodwig, Prince of Hohenlohe-Schillingsfürst
 Christian IX of Denmark
 Christian X of Denmark
 Constantine I of Greece
 Karl Ludwig d'Elsa
 Grand Duke Dmitry Konstantinovich of Russia
 Walter Dornberger
 Eduard, Duke of Anhalt
 Edward VII
 Prince Edward of Saxe-Weimar
 Ernest I, Duke of Saxe-Coburg and Gotha
 Ernest II, Duke of Saxe-Coburg and Gotha
 Ernest Louis, Grand Duke of Hesse
 Ernst I, Duke of Saxe-Altenburg
 Ernst Gunther, Duke of Schleswig-Holstein
 Ernst II, Duke of Saxe-Altenburg
 Archduke Eugen of Austria
 Prince Eugen, Duke of Närke
 Ferdinand I of Austria
 Ferdinand IV, Grand Duke of Tuscany
 Archduke Ferdinand Karl of Austria
 Otto-Wilhelm Förster
 Archduke Franz Ferdinand of Austria
 Franz Joseph I of Austria
 Frederick VIII of Denmark
 Frederick Augustus II, Grand Duke of Oldenburg
 Frederick Augustus III of Saxony
 Prince Frederick Charles of Hesse
 Frederick Francis II, Grand Duke of Mecklenburg-Schwerin
 Frederick Francis III, Grand Duke of Mecklenburg-Schwerin
 Frederick Francis IV, Grand Duke of Mecklenburg-Schwerin
 Frederick I, Duke of Anhalt
 Frederick I, Grand Duke of Baden
 Frederick III, German Emperor
 Prince Frederick of Hohenzollern-Sigmaringen
 Frederick William III of Prussia
 Frederick William IV of Prussia
 Frederick, Duke of Saxe-Altenburg
 Prince Friedrich of Saxe-Meiningen
 Prince Friedrich Karl of Prussia (1828–1885)
 Prince Friedrich Leopold of Prussia
 Archduke Friedrich, Duke of Teschen
 Joseph Geefs
 Georg II, Duke of Saxe-Meiningen
 Duke Georg Alexander of Mecklenburg-Strelitz
 Georg, Duke of Saxe-Altenburg
 Georg, Prince of Schaumburg-Lippe
 George I of Greece
 George V of Hanover
 George V
 Prince George of Prussia
 George, King of Saxony
 George Victor, Prince of Waldeck and Pyrmont
 Erich von Gündell
 Günther Victor, Prince of Schwarzburg
 Gustaf V
 Gottlieb Graf von Haeseler
 Alexander von Hartmann
 Heinrich XXVII, Prince Reuss Younger Line
 Prince Henry of Prussia (1862–1929)
 Heinrich VII, Prince Reuss of Köstritz
 Gotthard Heinrici
 Duke Henry of Mecklenburg-Schwerin
 Prince Henry of the Netherlands (1820–1879)
 Prince Hermann of Saxe-Weimar-Eisenach (1825–1901)
 Prince Hermann of Saxe-Weimar-Eisenach (1886–1964)
 Walter von Hippel
 Franz von Hipper
 Henning von Holtzendorff
 Friedrich von Ingenohl
 Isabella II of Spain
 Ito Hirobumi
 Prince Johann Georg of Saxony
 Archduke Joseph Karl of Austria
 Joseph, Duke of Saxe-Altenburg
 Prince Karl Anton of Hohenzollern
 Karl Anton, Prince of Hohenzollern
 Leonhard Kaupisch
 Mortimer von Kessel
 Hans von Kirchbach
 Grand Duke Kirill Vladimirovich of Russia
 Otto von Knobelsdorff
 Hans von Koester
 Grand Duke Konstantin Nikolayevich of Russia
 Konstantin of Hohenlohe-Schillingsfürst
 Julius Kühn
 Maximilian von Laffert
 Paul Laux
 Leopold I of Belgium
 Leopold II of Belgium
 Prince Leopold of Bavaria
 Leopold, Prince of Hohenzollern
 Karl Max, Prince Lichnowsky
 Fritz von Loßberg
 Louis III, Grand Duke of Hesse
 Erich Lüdke
 Ludwig II of Bavaria
 Ludwig III of Bavaria
 Prince Ludwig Ferdinand of Bavaria
 Archduke Ludwig Viktor of Austria
 Ludwig Wilhelm, Prince of Bentheim and Steinfurt
 Luís I of Portugal
 Luitpold, Prince Regent of Bavaria
 Georg von der Marwitz
 Prince Maximilian of Baden
 Prince Maximilian of Saxony (1870–1951)
 Emperor Meiji
 Klemens von Metternich
 Grand Duke Michael Nikolaevich of Russia
 Grand Duke Michael Alexandrovich of Russia
 Milan I of Serbia
 Helmuth von Moltke the Elder
 Curt von Morgen
 Prince Moritz of Saxe-Altenburg
 Karl Freiherr von Müffling
 Napoleon III
 Nicholas I of Russia
 Nicholas II of Russia
 Grand Duke Nicholas Konstantinovich of Russia
 Grand Duke Nicholas Nikolaevich of Russia (1831–1891)
 August Ludwig von Nostitz
 Alexey Fyodorovich Orlov
 Oscar II
 Archduke Otto of Austria (1865–1906)
 Otto of Greece
 Duke Paul Frederick of Mecklenburg
 Paul Frederick, Grand Duke of Mecklenburg-Schwerin
 Pedro II of Brazil
 Pedro V of Portugal
 Peter II, Grand Duke of Oldenburg
 Duke Peter of Oldenburg
 Prince Philippe, Count of Paris
 Prince Philippe, Count of Flanders
 Karl von Plettenberg
 Hugo von Pohl
 Prince Frederick William of Hesse-Kassel
 Prince Friedrich Wilhelm of Prussia
 Archduke Rainer Ferdinand of Austria
 Hubert von Rebeur-Paschwitz
 Duke Robert of Württemberg
 Prince Rudolf of Liechtenstein
 Rudolf, Crown Prince of Austria
 Eberhard Graf von Schmettow
 Ludwig von Schorn
 Grand Duke Sergei Alexandrovich of Russia
 Wilhelm Souchon
 Archduke Stephen of Austria (Palatine of Hungary)
 Alfred von Tirpitz
 Umberto I of Italy
 Walter von Unruh
 Victor Emmanuel III of Italy
 Grand Duke Vladimir Alexandrovich of Russia
 Illarion Vorontsov-Dashkov
 Wilhelm II, German Emperor
 Wilhelm Karl, Duke of Urach
 Prince Wilhelm of Prussia (1783–1851)
 Prince Wilhelm of Saxe-Weimar-Eisenach
 William I of the Netherlands
 William I of Württemberg
 William I, German Emperor
 William II of the Netherlands
 William II of Württemberg
 William III of the Netherlands
 William Ernest, Grand Duke of Saxe-Weimar-Eisenach
 William IV, Grand Duke of Luxembourg
 Prince William of Baden (1829–1897)
 William, Duke of Brunswick
 William, Prince of Hohenzollern
 William, Prince of Wied
 Ferdinand von Zeppelin

References

Orders, decorations, and medals of Weimar